Los Dos Caminos is a Caracas Metro station on Line 1. It was opened on 23 April 1988 as the eastern terminus of the extension of Line 1 from Chacaíto. On 10 November 1989, the line was extended further to Palo Verde. The station is between Miranda and Los Cortijos.

References

Caracas Metro stations
1988 establishments in Venezuela
Railway stations opened in 1988